Ford John Kiernan (born 10 January 1962) is a Scottish comedian, actor, and writer. He is best known for his work with Greg Hemphill on the BBC Scotland comedy series Chewin' the Fat (1999–2005) and Still Game (2002–2007, 2016–2019). He also starred as Archie Henderson in Dear Green Place (2007–2008) and as Colin Holliday in Happy Hollidays (2009).

Career

Kiernan first performed comedy in 1990 at the comedy club in the basement of the Blackfriars pub in Glasgow. He took up performing full-time in 1993. A run of successful solo jobs led to his being offered a slot in the Edinburgh Comedy Festival in 1994, in a show called The Best Of Scottish Comedy, alongside John Paul "JP" Leach and Alan Taylor. Leach and Kiernan teamed up as a double act during this festival, and had shows at the next two festivals, After Eight Mince and The Full Bhoona, both at the Gilded Balloon.

Kiernan was one of the first performers at The Comedy Cellar, a comedy night started in 1993 by Ed Byrne in Glasgow. He co-wrote a play with JP Leach, Don't Start Me, which won a Fringe First Award at the 1995 Edinburgh Fringe.

Kiernan has also broadcast frequently on BBC Radio Four and BBC Radio Scotland.

Television
Kiernan wrote sketches for Pulp Video (BBC Scotland 1995). Between 1999 and 2005 he was a writer for Chewin' the Fat and starred in it alongside Greg Hemphill, both playing various roles. Karen Dunbar, Paul Riley, and Mark Cox were also in the show. At first, it was shown only in Scotland, but the BBC broadcast the third and fourth series throughout the UK.

The spin-off Still Game started in Scotland only but later reached a wider audience. Every episode of this show was co-written by Kiernan and Hemphill. In 1999 and 2000 Kiernan and Hemphill also scripted seven episodes for the children's TV series Hububb, with Kiernan guest-starring in three episodes, including two of them written by other writers. 

In 2007 and 2008 Kiernan starred in Dear Green Place, a BBC One Scotland sitcom about park wardens. The show was co-written by Paul Riley and Rab Christie. In January 2009 Kiernan starred in No Holds Bard, a one-off comedy special shown on BBC Scotland on Burns Night as part of a line-up of special programmes to mark the 250th birthday of Robert Burns.

Kiernan played a caravan park boss in the comedy Happy Hollidays. A pilot episode was shown on BBC 1 in early 2009 and a series was broadcast later in the year. In October 2011 Kiernan played Gordon Brown in The Hunt for Tony Blair, a one-off episode of The Comic Strip Presents...

In 2011 and 2013, Kiernan played George McVie in The Field of Blood. In 2016 he played Felix in Journey Bound.

Films

Kiernan has had several bit-part roles in films. In 1996 he starred alongside Robert Carlyle in Carla's Song and in 2002 he played the role of Black Joke Chief in the Martin Scorsese film Gangs of New York.

Kiernan lends his voice to the character of Banjo Barry in the animated film Sir Billi. The film was released in 2012.

In 2012 Kiernan starred in the film Song for Amy. He has also starred in short films such as The Taxidermist and Perfect. In 2020, Kieran played the role of Gavin in the American comedy movie Then Came You, alongside Craig Ferguson who had appeared with Kiernan in Still Game three years earlier.

Filmography

Personal life
Born in Shettleston, Glasgow, Kiernan was educated at Alexandra Parade Primary School and Whitehill Secondary School. He then went on to train as a tailor and work as a barman at Glasgow University.

In January 2014 Ford's 12-year-old son Sonny was found dead in the family home.  The cause of death was choking.  The stage show Still Game Live was dedicated to Sonny later that year.

References

External links
 
 
 Gazetter for Scotland biography

Living people
1962 births
Male actors from Glasgow
People from Dennistoun
People educated at Whitehill Secondary School
Scottish male comedians
Scottish male film actors
Scottish male television actors
Comedians from Glasgow